Stammernenteria is a genus of mites in the family Nenteriidae.

Species
 Stammernenteria argentinensis (Hirschmann, 1978)     
 Stammernenteria hyatti (Hirschmann & Wisniewski, 1985)     
 Stammernenteria jabanica (Vitzthum, 1931)     
 Stammernenteria kashimensis (Hiramatsu, 1979)     
 Stammernenteria mesoamericana (Hirschmann & Wisniewski, 1985)     
 Stammernenteria micherdzinskii (Hirschmann & Zirngiebl-Nicol, 1969)     
 Stammernenteria pacifica (Vitzthum, 1935)     
 Stammernenteria pandioni (Wisniewski & Hirschmann, 1985)     
 Stammernenteria pilosella (Berlese, 1903)     
 Stammernenteria pilosellaoides (Hirschmann & Hiramatsu, 1978)     
 Stammernenteria ritzemai (Oudemans, 1903)     
 Stammernenteria ritzemaisimilis (Hirschmann & Hiramatsu, 1978)     
 Stammernenteria semiporula (Hirschmann & Wisniewski, 1985)     
 Stammernenteria stammeri (Hirschmann & Zirngiebl-Nicol, 1962)     
 Stammernenteria uropodina (Berlese, 1918)

References

Mesostigmata
Acari genera